Ryan Maduro (born April 6, 1986 in Providence, Rhode Island) is an American soccer player who currently plays for the Rhode Island Oceaneers.

Career

College and Amateur
Maduro attended Mt. Hope H.S. and was regarded as one of the top players in Rhode Island before enrolling at Providence College in 2004. In 2006 Maduro became only the second Friar to be named a first-team All-American and the first to be named first-team All-Big East.  During his four years with the Friars, Maduro appeared in 78 matches and scored 14 goals while assisting on 22 others.

Professional
Maduro signed with the Rhode Island Stingrays in May 2009. While with Rhode Island Maduro appeared in 9 matches and recorded 3 assists. In November 2009 he went on trial with C.D. Santa Clara of Portugal's Liga de Honra but did not sign with the club. For the 2010 season Maduro joined Ontario club Forest City London.

During the 2011 season Maduro trained with New York Red Bulls and played for the club's reserve side in the 2011 MLS Reserve Division.

After a pre-season trial with the club Maduro signed with New York on March 19, 2012. Maduro made his professional debut for New York on May 29, 2012 in a 3-0 victory over the Charleston Battery in the third round of the US Open Cup. This was his only appearance for New York before being waived by the club on July 28, 2012.

In May 2013, Maduro signed for Real Boston Rams. He made his debut in a 3-0 defeat to CFC Azul.

In May 2014, Maduro signed for Fylkir; an athletic club in Árbær, in the eastern part of Reykjavík, the capital of Iceland. Maduro made his debut on May 4, 2014 entering in the 63rd minute in a 1-0 loss to Stjarnan. Maduro made his first start on May 8, 2014 in a 3-0 loss to Hafnarfjordur.

References

External links
 Providence player profile 
 Wilmellaw.com profile

1986 births
Living people
American soccer players
Providence Friars men's soccer players
Rhode Island Stingrays players
FC London players
New York Red Bulls players
Real Boston Rams players
Soccer players from Rhode Island
USL League Two players
All-American men's college soccer players
Association football midfielders